Our Lady of the Sacred Heart Church is a Roman Catholic parish church in Wellingborough, Northamptonshire, England. It was built from 1884 to 1886 by Samuel Joseph Nicholl in the Gothic Revival style. It is located on Raneleigh Road, between Knox Road and Palk Road to the east of the town centre. It is a Grade II listed building.

History

Foundation
In 1869, a mission was founded in Wellingborough. It was supported by the Arkwright family from Knuston Hall, one of whom was the High Sheriff of Northamptonshire, Herbert Robert Arkwright. Mass was celebrated in Wellingborough in rented properties.

Construction
Between 1873 and 1882, the land for the current church was bought in stages. In 1884, Samuel Joseph Nicholl was commissioned to design the church. He was from London and also designed St Charles Borromeo Church, Westminster and taught Alexander Scoles. On 2 September 1886 the church was opened. The total cost of the church was £5,281. From 1893 to 1894, the presbytery was built and came to a total cost of £1,558.

Parish
The church is in the same parish as St Edmund Campion Church in Wellingborough. Our Lady of the Sacred Heart Church has three Sunday Masses at 6:00pm on Saturday, 9:00am on Sunday and a Polish Mass at 12:30pm on Sunday. St Edmund's Church has two Sunday Masses at 10:30am and 5:30pm.

See also
 Diocese of Northampton

References

External links
 

Wellingborough
Roman Catholic churches in Northamptonshire
Roman Catholic churches completed in 1886
Gothic Revival church buildings in England
Gothic Revival architecture in Northamptonshire
1884 establishments in England
Grade II listed churches in Northamptonshire
Grade II listed Roman Catholic churches in England
19th-century Roman Catholic church buildings in the United Kingdom